Chris McKhool (born November 18, 1968) is a Canadian violinist, producer, guitarist, composer, and singer-songwriter. He has received numerous awards for his work, including four JUNO Award nominations and four Canadian Folk Music Awards for his various recordings.

Biography
Chris McKhool was born in Ottawa and raised in a musical household. He began violin lessons at age 7, and studied classical violin under the tutelage of Joan Milkson of the National Arts Centre Orchestra from 1977 to 1985, as well as performing with the National Capital String Academy and teaching himself to play folk guitar. In 1985 he moved to Montreal to study at McGill University, obtaining a B.A. in Psychology. McKhool moved to Toronto in 1993, studying jazz at York University.

McKhool is known for his ability to bring together accomplished musicians of the world music scene. He has crossed the globe, performing at many prestigious festivals and earning four JUNO nominations and four Canadian Folk Music Awards.

His compositions have been performed with the Annapolis Symphony Orchestra, Chicago’s Full Score Chamber Orchestra, and the Bangor Symphony in the USA, as well as with many Canadian symphonies including Toronto, Vancouver, Edmonton, Kitchener-Waterloo Symphony, Niagara, North Bay, Windsor, and Kingston Symphony Orchestra.

In 2013 McKhool was presented with a Queen's Diamond Jubilee Medal for his work in supporting community and music education programs for at-risk youth, as well as for his dedication to raising awareness of social and environmental issues through music.

In 2004, McKhool co-founded the innovative world music collective Sultans of String, with Kevin Laliberté and Drew Birston, releasing six albums and winning multiple awards. Other band members include Eddie Paton, Rosendo Leon, and many special guests.

In 2015 McKhool produced the Sultans of String’s 5th album with JUNO Award winning engineer John “Beetle” Bailey, entitled Subcontinental Drift. This album was made in collaboration with sitarist Anwar Khurshid; in 2016 the band toured across Canada, the United States and the UK with this formation, showcasing their collaboration. This album also propelled them to the Billboard World Music charts in 2017. Subcontinental Drift also received a JUNO Award nomination in the World Music category as well as their 3rd Canadian Folk Music Award for World Group of the year.

In 2017 McKhool and Bailey co-produced a world music Christmas album with Sultans of String entitled Christmas Caravan. They toured across North America in support of the album, which was included in the New York Times Holiday Hits section and Spotify's Holiday Albums Hit List, as well as hitting the Billboard World Music charts at #6. Special guests included Richard Bona, Paddy Moloney (The Chieftains), Nikki Yanofsky, Ruben Blades, Sweet Honey in the Rock, Alex Cuba, as well as the City of Prague Philharmonic Orchestra. His song "Sing For Kwanzaa” with collaborator Richard Bona won the 2017 Folk Music Ontario: Songs From The Heart Award and the 2017 ISC International Songwriting Competition: World category

His co-write "Snake Charmer” was used in the soundtrack of the film "Hotel Mumbai", which premiered at TIFF (The Toronto International Film Festival) to critical acclaim in September 2018.

McKhool and Bailey are currently co-producing the 7th Sultans of String album. Entitled "Refuge", it features many special guests who are refugees and recent immigrants to Canada and USA, as well as global ambassador's for peace, showcasing their extraordinary contributions to society.  McKhool states "We believe that as a society, we derive strength from our diversity, We can find common ground between thoughts and ideas from around the globe, and this is an example we would like to show to our communities and our leaders."

For Refuge, McKhool and Bailey travelled from Canadian First Nations land to Toronto, New York, and Istanbul, Turkey to craft the sound of an album spanning many cultures, collaborating with artists as diverse as Béla Fleck, Yasmin Levy, and Turkish string ensemble Gundem Yayli Grubu.

McKhool has also worked with other notable recording engineers including Jeremy Darby (Live Aid, U2, Pink Floyd, Prince), George Seara (Jesse Cook, Michael Jackson, Sting) and Nik Tjelios (Ken Whiteley, Pete Seeger)

As a guest violin player, McKhool has also recorded and performed with several world, folk and jazz performers including Jesse Cook, Amanda Martinez, Pavlo, Club Django, Mike Ford, and Emm Gryner.

McKhool has also enjoyed a successful career performing for young audiences, appearing on television shows such as Mr. Dressup, YTV's Treehouse, TVOntario's Crawlspace and the CBC, as well as concerts across Canada. His 2008 children's album Fiddlefire! won the [[Canadian Folk Music Award for Best Children's Album, and was nominated for a JUNO Award. He has toured throughout Canada, including Baffin Island, as well as performing across the U.K. the United States, Indonesia, Cuba, Guatemala, Peru and Tibetan schools across the Indian Himalayas. FiddleFire! has been presented live at Toronto Harbourfront's Cushion Concert series, the Toronto International Jazz Festival, as part of JAZZ.FM education series, and headlined Toronto's First Night at the Rogers Centre (formerly Skydome.[5])

He created the world's largest bicycle bell orchestra in 2008, at Yonge-Dundas Square in Toronto with over 800 bell ringers.

Chris McKhool and Sultans of String are fundraising partners with the UNHCR and have also fundraised on behalf of the Outreach Foundation to assist refugees both in their homelands and those displaced by war.

Discography 
 Sultans of String: Sanctuary (2021)
 Sultans of String: Refuge (2020)
 Sultans of String: Christmas Caravan (2017)
 Sultans of String: Subcontinental Drift (2015)
 Sultans of String: Symphony (2013)
 Sultans of String: MOVE (September 1, 2011)
 Sultans of String: Yalla Yalla (2009)
 Chris McKhool: Fiddlefire! (2008)
 Sultans of String: Luna (2007)
 Chris McKhool: Celebrate! Holidays of the Global Village (2005)
 Chris McKhool: Turtle Island! (1999)
 Chris McKhool: Earth, Sea and Air (1996)

Awards and nominations 
 2021 Canadian Folk Music Awards winner (with co-producer John 'Beetle' Bailey) for Producer of the Year with Refuge
 2021 Canadian Folk Music Awards nominee for Ensemble of the Year with Refuge
 2020 Folk Music Ontario-Songwriting Award – Instrumental - "Refuge”
 2020 Folk Music Ontario-Songwriting Award – Political - "I Am a Refugee”
 2020 Independent Music Award - Instrumental Song of the Year -"The Grand Bazaar"
 2020 Independent Music Award - World Music Producer of the Year –Refuge
 2019 International Songwriting Competition: Folk semi-finals "Power Of The Land"
 2019 International Songwriting Competition: performance semi-finals "Power Of The Land"
 2018 Canadian Folk Music Awards: Producer of the Year nomination for McKhool
 2017 New York Times Hits List with Christmas Caravan
 2017 Billboard World Music Charts: Christmas Caravan CD hits #6
 2017 Canadian Nielsen World Music Charts: Christmas Caravan CD hits #3
 2017 Folk Music Ontario: Songs From The Heart Award for "Sing For Kwanzaa" from Christmas Caravan
 2017 Folk Music Ontario: Songs From The Heart Award for “Road to Kfarmishki”
 2017 ISC International Songwriting Competition: World category for "Sing For Kwanzaa"
 2017 JUNO Awards: Nominees for "World Music Album of the Year" for Subcontinental Drift
 2017 Billboard World Music Charts: Subcontinental Drift CD hits #15
 2016 Canadian Folk Music Awards: World Music Group of the Year
 2016 Global Music Awards: World Music/Beats
 2015 International Songwriting Competition (ISC) for "Ho Jamalo"
 2015 JUNO Awards: Nominees for "Instrumental Album of the Year" for Symphony!
 2015 Toronto Independent Music Award: World Music
 2014 SIRIUSXM Independent Music Awards Winner: World Group of the Year
 2014 IMA Independent Music Award Winner : Instrumental Song for "Josie"
 2014 IMA Independent Music Vox Pop Award: Music Producer (Chris McKhool) for Symphony!
 2013 ISC International Songwriting Competition: Instrumental category for "Monti's Revenge"
 2013 Folk Music Ontario: Songs From The Heart Award for "Monti's Revenge"
 2013 Festivals & Events: Performer of The Year
 2013 Queen’s Diamond Jubilee Medal for bandleader Chris McKhool
 2013 SiriusXM Canadian Indie Awards: Nominee for World Group of the Year
 2012 Canadian Folk Music Awards: World Music Group of the Year
 2012 Canadian Folk Music Awards: nominees for Instrumental Group & Pushing the Boundaries
 2012 Canadian Folk Music Awards: nominee for Producer of the Year (Chris McKhool)
 2012 Folk Music Ontario: Songs From the Heart
 2012 Festivals & Events: Entertainer of The Year
 2011 Ontario Contact: Artist of the Year
 2011 International Acoustic Music Awards: Finalist for Instrumental
 2011 Independent Music Awards: 2x Finalist for Instrumental Album & World Beat Album (Yalla Yalla!)
 2011 ISC International Songwriting Competition: 2x Finalist for Instrumental & World Music
 2010 JUNO Awards: Nominees for "Instrumental Album of the Year" (Yalla Yalla!)
 2010 Canadian Independent Music Awards: nominees for Favourite World Artist/Group
 2009 International Songwriting Competition (ISC): First Place Winners for Instrumental
 2009 Canadian Folk Music Awards: triple nominee winning Instrumental Group of the Year (also nominated for Ensemble of the Year and Pushing the Boundaries)
 2009 Toronto Exclusive Magazine Awards: 2x Winner for Best Toronto World CD & Artist of the Year
 2008 International Songwriting Competition(ISC): Winner - Instrumental
 2008 Festivals & Events Ontario: Best Variety Act
 2008 Canadian Independent Music Awards: Finalists for Favourite World Music Band
 2008 International Independent Music Awards: Finalists for Best World Fusion Song
 2007 Musique du Monde Award
 2007 Canadian Folk Music Awards: nominees for Best Instrumentalist Group
 2007 Ontario Independent Music Awards: Best Song & Best Instrumental
 2007 Toronto Independent Music Awards: nominees for World Music Category
 2006 Ontario Council of Folk Festivals - Songs of the Heart Competition Finalist
 2006 Parents' Choice Award for CD Celebrate! Holidays of the Global Village
 2005 Green Toronto Award of Excellence for Earth, Seas & Air Children's Concert
 2004 National Jazz Awards nomination (with Club Django, Trad. Jazz)
 2004 CIUT-FM Award for Outstanding Musical Accompanist (violin)
 1996 Parents' Choice Award for CD Earth, Seas & Air

McKhool's 2008 children's album Fiddlefire! has been nominated for numerous awards, including:

 2009 JUNO Award nominee with Fiddlefire!
 2009 Canadian Folk Music Awards - Children's Album of the Year with Fiddlefire!
 2009 Parents' Choice Award with Fiddlefire!
 2009 iParenting Media Award with Fiddlefire!
 2009 Canadian Children's Book Centre 'Best of 2009' with Fiddlefire!  

For a list of awards with Sultans of String, see main article: Sultans of String

References

External links
 http://www.sultansofstring.com
 http://www.fiddlefire.com
 https://www.facebook.com/mckhool
 https://twitter.com/chrismckhool
 https://www.youtube.com/sultansofstring

1968 births
21st-century Canadian violinists and fiddlers
21st-century Canadian male musicians
Canadian folk violinists
Canadian jazz violinists
Canadian male violinists and fiddlers
Canadian male composers
Canadian Folk Music Award winners
Canadian male jazz musicians
Canadian record producers
Canadian guitarists
Canadian male singer-songwriters
Canadian singer-songwriters
Living people
Musicians from Ottawa